Făleștii Noi is a commune in Făleşti District, Moldova. It is composed of two villages, Făleștii Noi and Pietrosul Nou.

References

Communes of Fălești District